Jerome Singleton (born July 7, 1986) is a Paralympic athlete from the United States competing mainly in category T44 (single below knee amputation) sprint events. Because he had no fibula in his right calf, his leg was amputated below the knee when he was 18 months old.

Singleton was born in Greenwood, South Carolina, and attended Dutch Fork High School where he played varsity football, junior varsity basketball and track. He holds a bachelor's degree in math and applied physics from Morehouse College and a bachelor's in industrial and operations engineering from the University of Michigan. He has worked as a researcher at NASA and CERN.

Major achievements 
 2011: Gold medal, 100m (T43/44), Silver medal, 200m (T43/44), 4 × 100 m relay (T42-46) – IPC Athletics World Championships, Christchurch, New Zealand
 2010: Second place, 100m (T44), 200m (T44) – U.S. Paralympics Track & Field National Championships, Miramar, Florida
 2009: Silver medal, 100m (T44); Set new course record 11.16 seconds VISA Paralympic World Cup, Manchester, UK
 2009: Gold medal, 100m- Boiling Point Track Classic, Windsor, Ontario, Canada
 2009: Gold medal, 200m; silver medal, 100m – Loterias Caixa International Meeting for Athletics and Swimming, Rio de Janeiro, Brazil
 2008: Silver medal, 100m (T44) – Paralympic Games, Beijing, China
 2008: Gold medal, 100m; silver medal 200m – Paralympic World Cup, Manchester, UK
 2007: Bronze medal 100m (T44), Silver medal 200m (T44) ParaPan American Games, Rio de Janeiro, Brazil
 2007: Inducted into Phi Beta Kappa (Nation's Oldest Academic Honor Society)
 2006: Gold medal, 100m, Long Jump, High Jump; Bronze medal, 200m – Endeavor Games, Edmond, Oklahoma
 2006: SIAC All-Conference All-Academic Team Track and Field;
 2006: Inducted into Beta Kappa Chi (National Scientific Honor Society);
High School
 Lettered in Varsity Football and Track
 Made Track Regional Finals in the 110 and 400m hurdles
 South Carolina High School League Scholar Athlete Award for Outstanding Athletic and Academic Achievement
 Member of National Honor Society at Dutch Fork High School
 Member of the Omega Psi Phi fraternity (Psi chapter Morehouse College)

See also
 The Mechanics of Running Blades

References

External links
 
 University of Michigan Podcast – A podcast featuring Jerome Singleton by the University of Michigan's Department of Information for Undergraduate Students.

Living people
People associated with CERN
Track and field athletes from South Carolina
Paralympic track and field athletes of the United States
Athletes (track and field) at the 2008 Summer Paralympics
Athletes (track and field) at the 2016 Summer Paralympics
Paralympic gold medalists for the United States
Paralympic silver medalists for the United States
American male sprinters
1986 births
University of Michigan College of Engineering alumni
People from Greenwood, South Carolina
People from Irmo, South Carolina
Medalists at the 2008 Summer Paralympics
Paralympic medalists in athletics (track and field)
Medalists at the 2007 Parapan American Games
Morehouse Maroon Tigers
College men's track and field athletes in the United States